"One to Another" is a song by British alternative rock band the Charlatans. It was the first single from their fifth album, Tellin' Stories (1997), and their first single following the death of the band's keyboardist, Rob Collins. The single remains their highest-charting song in the UK, reaching number three on the UK Singles Chart. "One to Another" features drum loops provided by Tom Rowlands of the Chemical Brothers. The song serves as the theme song to the UK channel E4 show My Mad Fat Diary.

In 2022, Pixey and Mint Royale released a cover of the song. Their version is currently the theme song for the BT Sport 2022-23 Premier League season.

Track listings
All tracks were written by Martin Blunt, Jon Brookes, Tim Burgess, Mark Collins, Rob Collins.

UK CD single
 "One to Another"
 "Two of Us"
 "Reputation"

UK 7-inch and cassette single
 "One to Another" – 4:32
 "Two of Us" – 4:07

Credits and personnel
Credits are adapted from the Tellin' Stories album booklet.

Studios
 Recorded and mixed at Monnow Valley Studios (Rockfield, Wales)
 Partially recorded at Rockfield Studios (Rockfield, Wales)

Personnel
 The Charlatans – production
 Martin Blunt – writing, bass
 Jon Brookes – writing, drums
 Tim Burgess – writing, vocals
 Mark Collins – writing, guitar
 Rob Collins – writing, vocals, keyboards
 Martin Duffy – keyboards
 Dave Charles – percussion, production, engineering
 Tom Rowlands – loops

Charts

Weekly charts

Year-end charts

Certifications

Release history

References

The Charlatans (English band) songs
1996 singles
1996 songs
Beggars Banquet Records singles
MCA Records singles
Music videos directed by Lindy Heymann
Number-one singles in Scotland